Scotland Forever! is an 1881 oil painting by Lady Butler depicting the start of the charge of the Royal Scots Greys, a British heavy cavalry regiment that charged with other British heavy cavalry at the Battle of Waterloo in 1815. The painting has been reproduced many times and is considered an iconic representation of the battle itself, and of heroism more generally.

Butler was inspired to paint the charge as a response to the aesthetic paintings that she saw—and intensely disliked—on a visit to the Grosvenor Gallery. She had developed a reputation for her military pictures after the favourable reception of her earlier painting The Roll Call of 1874, on a subject from the Crimean War, and her 1879 painting Remnants of an Army, on the 1842 retreat from Kabul.

Although Butler had never observed a battle, she was permitted to watch her husband's regiment during training maneuvers, positioning herself in front of charging horses in order to observe their movement. In reality however, it appears that the Scots Greys did not start the charge at a gallop, due to the broken ground, and instead advanced at a quick walk. The horses which dominate the picture are heavy grey mounts, allegedly used by the regiment throughout its history until mechanisation, although at Waterloo (and earlier), it seems they had brown horses like the other heavy cavalry regiments, and the name "greys" is actually derived from the grey uniforms the regiment wore in the early 18th century. The bearskin caps were covered during the actual battle by black oilskin covers.

The title comes from the battle cry of the soldiers—the Greys called "Now, my boys, Scotland forever!" as they charged.

The painting was exhibited at the Egyptian Hall in Piccadilly in 1881. Tzar Nicholas II of Russia and Kaiser Wilhelm II of Germany both received copies and later during the First World War both the British and the Germans used the image in their propaganda material, with the Scots Greys transformed into Prussian cavalry by the Germans.

In 1888 Colonel Thomas Walter Harding donated the painting to Leeds Art Gallery.

The lead rider is arguably either Lt Col James Hamilton who led the first charge but was killed in the second smaller charge, or Captain Edward Cheney who had his horse shot from under him five times in the battle, once on each charge, who was promoted to Brevet Colonel in the field due to the death of both Hamilton and Sir William Ponsonby, and led the 3rd, 4th and 5th charge. The painting is not intended to be a portrait of either.

Cultural references
The scene was used as an inspiration for the depiction of the same charge in the 1970 film Waterloo.

References

1881 paintings
Paintings by Elizabeth Thompson
Waterloo campaign in paintings
Military of Scotland
Paintings in Leeds
Horses in art
War paintings